This is a list of 121 species in Systoechus, a genus of bee flies in the family Bombyliidae.

Systoechus species

 Systoechus aberrans Hesse, 1938 c g
 Systoechus acridophagus Hesse, 1938 c g
 Systoechus affinis Hesse, 1938 c g
 Systoechus albicans (Macquart, 1846) c g
 Systoechus albidus Loew, 1860 c g
 Systoechus albipectus Hesse, 1938 c g
 Systoechus altivolans Hesse, 1938 c g
 Systoechus anthophilus Hesse, 1938 c g
 Systoechus arabicus Greathead, 1980 c g
 Systoechus argyroleucus Hesse, 1938 c g
 Systoechus argyropogonus Hesse, 1938 c g
 Systoechus atriceps Bowden, 1964 c g
 Systoechus audax Greathead, 1967 c g
 Systoechus aureus Hesse, 1938 c g
 Systoechus auricomatus Bowden, 1959 c g
 Systoechus aurifacies Greathead, 1958 c g
 Systoechus auripilus Hesse, 1938 c g
 Systoechus aurulentus (Wiedemann, 1820) c g
 Systoechus austeni Bezzi, 1924 c g
 Systoechus autumanalis (Pallas & Wiedemann, 1818) c g
 Systoechus autumnalis Becker, 1910 c g
 Systoechus badipennis Hesse, 1938 c g
 Systoechus badius Hesse, 1938 c g
 Systoechus bombycinus Hesse, 1938 c g
 Systoechus brunnibasis Hesse, 1938 c g
 Systoechus brunnipennis (Loew, 1852) c g
 Systoechus candidulus Loew, 1863 i c g b
 Systoechus candidus Hesse, 1938 c g
 Systoechus canescens Hesse, 1938 c g
 Systoechus canicapilis Bowden, 1959 c g
 Systoechus canipectus Hesse, 1938 c g
 Systoechus canus (Macquart, 1840) c g
 Systoechus castanealis Greathead, 1996 c g
 Systoechus cellularis Bowden, 1959 c g
 Systoechus chlamydicterus Hesse, 1938 c g
 Systoechus chrystallinus Bezzi, 1924 c g
 Systoechus claripennis (Macquart, 1840) c
 Systoechus croceipilus Greathead, 1980 c g
 Systoechus ctenopterus (Mikan, 1976) c g
 Systoechus damarensis Hesse, 1938 c g
 Systoechus deceptus Hesse, 1938 c g
 Systoechus eremophilus Hesse, 1936 c g
 Systoechus eupogonatus Bigot, 1892 c g
 Systoechus exiguus Hesse, 1938 c g
 Systoechus exilipes Bezzi, 1923 c g
 Systoechus faustus Hesse, 1938 c g
 Systoechus flavicapillis Bowden, 1959 c g
 Systoechus flavospinosus Brunetti, 1920 c g
 Systoechus fuligineus Loew, 1863 c g
 Systoechus fumipennis Painter, 1962 i c g
 Systoechus fumitinctus Hesse, 1938 c g
 Systoechus fusciventris Hesse, 1938 c g
 Systoechus goliath Bezzi, 1922 c g
 Systoechus gomezmenori Andreu Rubio, 1959 c g
 Systoechus gradatus (Wiedemann, 1820) c g
 Systoechus grandis Paramonov, 1940 c g
 Systoechus heteropogon Bowden, 1959 c g
 Systoechus horridus Greathead, 1980 c g
 Systoechus inordinatus Hesse, 1938 c g
 Systoechus kalaharicus Hesse, 1936 c g
 Systoechus lacus Bowden, 1964 c g
 Systoechus laevifrons (Loew, 1855) c g
 Systoechus leoninus Bowden, 1964 c g
 Systoechus leucostictus Hesse, 1938 c g
 Systoechus lightfooti Hesse, 1938 c g
 Systoechus litoralis Bowden, 1964 c g
 Systoechus longirostris Becker, 1916 c g
 Systoechus lucidus (Loew, 1855) c g
 Systoechus marshalli Paramonov, 1931 c g
 Systoechus melanpogon Bezzi, 1912 c g
 Systoechus mentiens Bezzi, 1924 c g
 Systoechus microcephalus (Loew, 1855) c g
 Systoechus mixtus (Wiedemann, 1821) c g
 Systoechus montanus Hesse, 1938 c g
 Systoechus monticolanus Hesse, 1938 c g
 Systoechus montuosus Greathead, 1967 c g
 Systoechus namaquensis Hesse, 1938 c g
 Systoechus neglectus Hesse, 1938 c g
 Systoechus nigribarbus (Loew, 1852) c g
 Systoechus nigripes Loew, 1863 c g
 Systoechus nivalis Brunetti, 1912 c g
 Systoechus niveicomatus Bowden, 1959 c g
 Systoechus oreas Osten Sacken, 1877 i c g b
 Systoechus pallidipilosus Austen, 1937 c g
 Systoechus pallidulus (Walker, 1849) c g
 Systoechus phaeopterus Bezzi, 1924 c g
 Systoechus polioleucus Hesse, 1938 c g
 Systoechus poweri Hesse, 1938 c g
 Systoechus pumilio Becker, 1915 c g
 Systoechus pumilo Becker, 1915 g
 Systoechus quasiminimus Evenhuis & Greathead, 1999 c g
 Systoechus rhodesianus Hesse, 1938 c g
 Systoechus robustus Bezzi, 1912 c g
 Systoechus rudebecki Hesse, 1955 c g
 Systoechus salticola Hesse, 1938 c g
 Systoechus scabrirostris Bezzi, 1921 c g
 Systoechus scutellaris (Wiedemann, 1828) c
 Systoechus scutellatus (Macquart, 1840) c g
 Systoechus segetus Bowden, 1964 c g
 Systoechus silvaticus Hesse, 1938 c g
 Systoechus simplex Loew, 1860 c g
 Systoechus sinaiticus Efflatoun, 1945 c g
 Systoechus socius (Walker, 1852) c g
 Systoechus solitus (Walker, 1849) i c b
 Systoechus somali Oldroyd, 1947 c g
 Systoechus spinithorax Bezzi, 1921 c g
 Systoechus srilankae Zaitzev, 1988 c g
 Systoechus stevensoni Hesse, 1938 c g
 Systoechus subcontiguus Hesse, 1938 c g
 Systoechus submicans Greathead, 1980 c g
 Systoechus subulinus Bowden, 1964 c g
 Systoechus tesquorum Becker, 1916 c g
 Systoechus titan Greathead, 1996 c g
 Systoechus transvaalensis Hesse, 1938 c g
 Systoechus tumidifrons Bezzi, 1921 c g
 Systoechus ventricosus Bezzi, 1921 c g
 Systoechus vulgaris Loew, 1863 i c g b  (grasshopper bee fly)
 Systoechus vulpinus Becker, 1910 c g
 Systoechus waltoni Hesse, 1938 c g
 Systoechus xanthoplocamus Francois, 1964 c g
 Systoechus xerophilus Hesse, 1938 c g

Data sources: i = ITIS, c = Catalogue of Life, g = GBIF, b = Bugguide.net

References

Systoechus
Articles created by Qbugbot